Hendrik Witbooi (c. 1830 – 29 October 1905) was a chief of the ǀKhowesin people, a sub-tribe of the Khoikhoi. He led the Nama people during their revolts against German colonial rule in present-day Namibia, in connection with the events surrounding the Herero and Namaqua Genocide. He was killed in action on 29 October 1905. Witbooi is regarded as one of the national heroes of Namibia, and his face is portrayed on the obverse of all N$50, N$100 and N$200 Namibian dollar banknotes.

Names

Kaptein Hendrik Witbooi (also spelt Witboi) was also known by the Nama name  and the nickname Kort (from Dutch kort = short), in Herero Korota or pejorative Otjikorota.

Family and early life

The family of Hendrik Witbooi made its mark as important members of Nama tribes.  His grandfather, David Witbooi, was Chief of the tribe, who led the tribe across the Orange River into Namaland. His father, Moses Witbooi, was also a Chief of the tribe.  His uncle, Jonker Afrikaner, was also a well-known Nama Chief, and opponent of Hendrik Witbooi. Jonker Afrikaner was in turn the son of the famous Jager Afrikaner. Hendrik Witbooi himself had seven sons and five daughters, including his son Isaak Witbooi.

Witbooi was born circa 1830 in Pella, Northern Cape, in the Cape Colony, which is today part of South Africa. He was educated as a Lutheran by German missionary Johannes Olp, and was well-versed in many languages, including his native Nama. He was a member of the Nama people, also known as the Khoikhoi.

The ǀKhowesin Nama and other Nama tribes often fought amongst each other and with Herero tribes. After almost being killed in a conflict with the Hereros, he had a vision that he had been chosen by God to lead his people north.

Witbooi was educated at Rhenish Missionary and Wesleyan Methodist Schools in Namibia as well as at the Wilberforce Institute in Evaton, South Africa.
First he took up employment as teacher in 1856 at Keetmanshoop, transferred in 1859 to Maltahöhe, and returned in 1865 to Gibeon at the request of the community and the Church to build on the foundations laid by his ageing father.

Rise to influence

Witbooi moved north on 16 May 1884, with a faction of the ǀKhowesin tribe. This was against the wishes of his father, Moses, who remained opposed to Hendrik's plans. As evidenced from his diaries (which contain a large portion of the surviving documents of Witbooi) he still admired his father greatly, in spite of their political difference. On 22 February 1887, Moses' chief rival, his subchief Paul Visser, had Moses killed and deposed.

Hendrik Witbooi held leadership at Gibeon in 1888, long after the death of Jonker Afrikaner in 1861 caused a power struggle among the various groups for paramount leadership. Several combat incorporated various leaders ensured until Hendrik finally defeated his last chief rival, Paul Visser, in July 1888 and took over leadership at Gibeon. Hendrik retaliated on 12 July 1888, shooting Visser. This led to Hendrik becoming chief of the ǀKhowesin people. He began to unite other Nama tribes under his control as well. By 1890, Hendrik Witbooi was signing all his letters, 'Chief of Great Namaqualand'.

German conflicts

In the early morning of 12 April 1893, the ǀKhowesin were attacked by the Germans at Hornkranz. Many were killed, although Hendrik managed to escape with most of his fighting men.  He campaigned against the Germans for two years, until the treaty of Gurus on 15 September 1894 where he agreed to a conditional surrender. Witbooi also decided to render military support for the Germans against other smaller tribes, such as the eastern Mbanderu Herero, Afrikaners, and Swartbooi.

After serving as a branch of the German army fighting against the Herero for the previous three years, Witbooi and the Nama again revolted against German rule in Namibia on 3 October 1904. During the ensuing war with the Germans in 1904–1905, Witbooi rallied his people with the conviction God had guided them to fight for their freedom from the imperialists. Witbooi was killed in action on 29 October 1905, near Vaalgras, near Koichas.  His dying request was: "It is enough. The children should now have rest".  He was replaced by Fransman Nama until the Nama surrendered in 1908.

Recognition

Kaptein Hendrik Witbooi is one of nine national heroes of Namibia that were identified at the inauguration of the country's Heroes' Acre near Windhoek. Founding president Sam Nujoma remarked in his inauguration speech on 26 August 2002 that:
Kaptein Hendrik Witbooi was the first African leader who took up arms against the German imperialists and foreign occupiers in defence of our land and territorial integrity. We, the new generation of the Land of the Brave, are inspired by Kaptein Hendrik Witbooi's revolutionary action in combat against the German Imperialists who colonised and oppressed our peoples. To his revolutionary spirit and his visionary memory we humbly offer our honour and respect.
Witbooi is honoured in form of a granite tombstone with his name engraved and his portrait plastered onto the slab. His face was portrayed on the obverse of all Namibian dollar banknotes until 20 March 2012, and is still on all N$50, N$100 and N$200 notes.

Witbooi's diary and complete correspondence has survived and became known as the Hendrik Witbooi Papers. It is stored in the National Archives of Namibia in Windhoek. UNESCO inscribed it in its Memory of the World Register – Africa.

References

External links
 
 The Diaries of Hendrik Witbooi
 Compilation of letters and the diary from Hendrik Witbooi (German)
 The Cardboard Box Travel Shop: Hendrik Witbooi
 The Namibian, 14 October 2009: Hendrik Witbooi: A Tribute

1830 births
1905 deaths
People from Khâi-Ma Local Municipality
Nama people
Namibian chiefs
People from Hardap Region
National heroes of Namibia
Namibian revolutionaries
Military personnel killed in action